Al Murray's Great British Pub Quiz is a British television game show first broadcast on 7 March 2019. In each episode two teams comprising three members from a pub in the United Kingdom compete in a pub quiz. The show is presented by Al Murray with Shaun Williamson as the barman, who assists the host and keeps the score.

References

External links

2010s British game shows
2020s British game shows
2019 British television series debuts
English-language television shows
Quest (British TV channel) original programming